Anna Ivanovna Otke (Russian: Анна Ивановна Отке; born 21 December 1974), is a Russian politician, who is a member of the Federation Council of Chukotka Autonomous Okrug on executive authority since 25 September 2013.

Since 9 March 2022, she has been under personal EU sanctions.

Biography

Anna Otke was born on 21 December 1974. In 1997, she graduated with a bachelor's degree, and in 1999, with  a master's degree at the Department of International Law of the Peoples' Friendship University of Russia. She has a PhD in law, with the thesis topic “International Legal Aspects of Environmental Security of the CIS Member States”.

From 2005 to 2009, she worked in the apparatus of the governor and government of the Chukotka Autonomous Okrug as the chief specialist of the department for the affairs of indigenous peoples of the region.

Between 2009 and 2013, she worked as a social development manager at ZAO Chukotka Mining and Geological Company.

Since 2011, she has been the president of the regional public organization "Association of Indigenous Peoples of Chukotka".

On 26 September 2013, the elected governor of Chukotka, Roman Kopin, appointed Otke as the representative of the region's executive power in the Federation Council.

References

1974 births
Living people
United Russia politicians
People from Chukotka Autonomous Okrug
Members of the Federation Council of Russia (after 2000)
21st-century Russian women politicians
Peoples' Friendship University of Russia alumni